Lloyd Lindroth (June 6, 1931 – June 9, 1994) was an American harpist who was nicknamed "The Liberace of the Harp". He had played for millions of people at the time of his death. A Seattle native, Lindroth began playing at age 14. 

In 1983, he moved to Nashville, where he would stay until his death, three days after his 63rd birthday, following a bout with pneumonia. He played many shows in Las Vegas, where he was buried.

Appearances 
as musician:
Roots (soundtrack)

 The Nashville Network

 Peter Gunn, episode: "Blind Item"

as actor:
 Easter Parade of Stars Auto Show (as himself)

References

External links

1931 births
1994 deaths
American harpists
20th-century American musicians